The Houde Institute (Chinese: 厚德智库, lit: Houde think tank ) is a Think-tank based in Beijing which specializes in research related to international relations. The Institute was established in 2019 and is currently led by Wang Hongjuan. The institute conducts research and policy recommendations regarding China's international relations, China's Belt and Road Initiative, technology innovation, crisis management as well as other topics.

Activities 
In June 2020, Houde Institute signed an agreement with South Africa's Inclusive Society Institute for strategic cooperation on both countries' economic development and cooperation on the Belt and Road Initiative.

References

Political and economic think tanks based in China
Foreign policy and strategy think tanks in China
Global economic research
Think tanks established in 2019